Whelan's is a pub and music venue in Dublin, Ireland.

Profile
Numerous international artists have played at the venue, including Jeff Buckley, Arctic Monkeys, Bloc Party, Kate Nash, Townes Van Zandt, Damien Rice and Allen Toussaint. The pub was also the location for scenes of the movie P.S. I Love You in which the characters take a trip to Ireland. The pub is quoted in the film as follows: "Denise, take Holly to Whelan's, my favourite pub. There's beautiful music to be heard, beautiful people to be around ".

Notable acts
Many Irish and international acts have performed at Whelan's, including:

 Airbourne 
 Andy Irvine & Dick Gaughan
 Arctic Monkeys
 Bloc Party
 Brave Giant
 Christy Moore
 Damien Rice
 David Kitt
 Dum Dum Girls  
 Ed Sheeran 
 Fight Like Apes 
 Hozier
 Josh Ritter 
 Kate Nash
 Mumford & Sons  
 Nick Cave 
 Paddy Casey
 Shed Seven
 Something Happens
 The Academic
 The Corrs
 The Cribs
 The Frames 
 The Pale 
 The Twang

References

External links
 Official site

Music in Dublin (city)
Music venues in Dublin (city)